BYG Records was a French record label known for the Actuel series specializing in free jazz. However, the label released a handful of non-jazz recordings by artists such as Musica Elettronica Viva, Freedom and Gong.

History
BYG Records was founded in March 1967 by Jean Georgakarakos, Jean-Luc Young, and Fernand Boruso. The name of the label was formed from the initial letters of the founders' surnames. Georgakarakos had previously established himself as a record distributor and importer, while Young worked for Barclay Records and Boruso for Saravah, the record label formed by Pierre Barouh.

The label invited American free jazz musicians to Paris to record in the summer of 1969, a time when they were receiving little support or attention in the United States. Many of these musicians were already overseas at the time, having appeared at the Pan-African Music Festival in Algiers in July 1969. (Jazz photographer Jacques Bisceglia was largely responsible for connecting the label and musicians, and the "B" in BYG is often wrongly held to refer to Bisceglia.) The resulting albums are an important repository of free jazz recordings from the period.

BYG Actuel was also responsible for organising the Actuel festival, which took place in late October 1969 in the small Belgian town of Amougies. The festival was initially intended to take place in or near Paris, but was banned by the French authorities. It featured many leading exponents of progressive rock, such as Frank Zappa, Pink Floyd, Captain Beefheart, Soft Machine, Ten Years After, Yes and The Nice. The festival was a popular success, with around 20,000 visitors over five nights, but it was a financial failure. In July 1970, Georgakarakos organised the Popanalia festival at Biot on the French Riviera, but this was also financially unsuccessful. By 1972, financial problems had plagued BYG to the point where it virtually went underground. Georgakarakos and Young later formed their own record labels, Celluloid (Georgakarakos) and Charly (Young). In 2002 a compilation album featuring the best of the label, JazzActuel: a collection of avant garde/free jazz/psychedelia from the BYG/Actuel catalogue of 1969–1971, was released by Charly (as a 3-CD set) and Get Back Records of Italy (as a 6-LP set). The collection was curated by Thurston Moore of Sonic Youth and journalist Byron Coley.

Discography 
(Actuel series releases)

(Pop Blues series releases)

Website
BYG Records launched its own website in 2020: http://www.bygrecords.com/

See also
 List of record labels

References

Defunct record labels of France
French record labels
Record labels established in 1967
Record labels disestablished in 1972
Jazz record labels